Commander One is a dual-pane file manager for macOS, created entirely in Swift. The app is developed by Eltima Software.

Apart from basic operations such as creating and managing folders, deleting, copying, moving and renaming files, it also provides functionality that default OS X file manager does not. The app exploits the classic dual-pane interface ideology, offers multi-tab browsing, advanced search, hotkeys setup, ZIP support; displays hidden files, allows renaming files or folders when moving, working with local and network drives. So-called Brief mode is meant for browsing many files and folders. 
 
There is a paid edition of this application known as PRO Pack. Its extra benefits include built-in FTP client; ability to mount MTP and iOS devices; RAR, TBZ, TGZ, 7z formats support; Dropbox integration; Terminal emulator and more. Positioned as an app for ‘Mac power users’, Commander One replicates the functionality of a namebrand dual-pane file manager, but also has features aimed specifically at OS X users.

Reception
MacWorld rated Commander One as 3.5 out of 5 stars, concluding that it adds some useful functions to the standard
Finder, but it was let down by its user interface and bugs in some of its functions, in particular with built-in FTP manager; the article was later updated with a notice that the problem with FTP manager had been solved by a subsequent update (version 1.2).

TechRepublic's review mentions that Commander One offers convenient efficiencies and simplifies the workflow with its dual pane interface and a number of features, like FTP client, compression support, Terminal Emulator and Dropbox integration. In general author finds it a handy application to use.

Tom Nelson in his review of Commander One on About.com highlights the app's features, including File Viewer, FTP/SFTP/FTPS client, Dropbox integration, view modes etc., and draws the conclusion that "Commander One provides additional file management capabilities at a very reasonable price (free), and offers more advanced functions as add-ons that you can purchase or not, depending on your needs."

References

External links

File managers
FTP clients
Orthodox file managers
Utilities for macOS